Hahnodon ("Hahn's tooth") is an extinct genus of mammaliaforms from the Early Cretaceous Ksar Metlili Formation in Morocco. Although originally considered to be a relatively early member of the extinct clade Multituberculata, recent studies indicate that it instead is a haramiyid.

Fossils and distribution
Hahnodon taqueti is based on a single lower molar found in Lower Cretaceous strata in Morocco.

Classification
Denise Sigogneau-Russell (1991) classified Hahnodon as a member of Multituberculata, but others later considered it to be related to members of Haramiyida. The description of Cifelliodon from North America confirmed that Hahnodon — and by extension, Hahnodontidae — belong to Haramiyida.

References

Bibliography 
 Sigogneau-Russell (1991), "First evidence of Multituberculata (Mammalia) in the Mesozoic of Africa". Neues Jahrb Geol Paläontol, Monatshefte, p. 119-125.
 Kielan-Jaworowska Z & Hurum JH (2001), "Phylogeny and Systematics of multituberculate mammals". Paleontology 44, p. 389-429.
 Much of this information has been derived from  MESOZOIC MAMMALS: Basal Multituberculata, an Internet directory.

Haramiyida
Prehistoric cynodont genera
Berriasian life
Early Cretaceous synapsids
Cretaceous Morocco
Fossils of Morocco
Fossil taxa described in 1991
Taxa named by Denise Sigogneau‐Russell